The Downtown Charles Town Historic District comprises the commercial center of Charles Town, West Virginia. The district centers on Washington Street and includes the Jefferson County Courthouse and the New Opera House, themselves on the National Register of Historic Places.  Other structures include the Market House, the Independent Fire Company building and the Post Office.  A few very early buildings are included, such as the Sheetz House, dating to 1797.

The town is significant as the scene of the trial of John Brown and as a contested town during the American Civil War.  Charles Town is closely associated with the Washington family, as it was laid out by George Washington's brother Charles Washington.

During the Civil War, there was fighting in the town itself on several occasions. In 1864, General Philip Sheridan used the Rutherford House at 417 East Washington Street as a headquarters for the Valley Campaign, meeting General Ulysses S. Grant there.

See also
 Charles Washington House (Happy Retreat or Mordington)
 Old Charles Town Historic District

References

National Register of Historic Places in Jefferson County, West Virginia
Historic districts in Jefferson County, West Virginia
Commercial buildings on the National Register of Historic Places in West Virginia
Houses on the National Register of Historic Places in West Virginia
Georgian architecture in West Virginia
Federal architecture in West Virginia
Greek Revival architecture in West Virginia
Houses in Jefferson County, West Virginia
Historic districts on the National Register of Historic Places in West Virginia
1997 establishments in West Virginia
Buildings and structures in Charles Town, West Virginia